Giolitti is a well-known café and pastry shop, and reportedly the oldest ice cream parlor in Rome, Italy. It was founded in 1890 by Giuseppe and Bernardina Giolitti and opened their first creamery in Salita del Grillo. Soon after, they became the supplier of the Italian royal family. It is still owned by the same family and operates at two locations: via Uffici del Vicario near the Pantheon and in E.U.R.

References

External links
Official website

1890 establishments in Italy
Shops in Rome
Ice cream parlors
Restaurants in Rome